John Paul Lyndon Regis, MBE (born 13 October 1966) is an English former sprinter. During his career, he won gold medals in the 200 metres at the 1989 World Indoor Championships and the 1990 European Championships, and a silver medal in the distance at the 1993 World Championships.

He was a member of the British teams which won the gold medal in the 4 × 400 metres relay at the 1991 World Championships, and the silver medal in the 4 × 100 metres relay at the 1988 Olympic Games. Regis is still the British 200 metres record-holder, which he set in 1994.

Career
Regis's most significant successes in individual events came when competing in the 200 metres. He was the first British athlete to run under 20 seconds for the distance, and still holds the UK record for the event. He was an indoor world champion and an outdoor World Championship runner-up at the distance, and also finished sixth in the event at the 1992 Olympic Games. 

Regis also achieved considerable success running in relay races, winning major international medals in both the 4 x 100 metres relay and the 4 x 400 metres relay. Most notably, he ran the third leg for the British 4 × 400 m relay team at the 1991 World Championships in Tokyo, helping them defeat the heavily favoured team from the United States and claim the gold medal. He was also a part of the British 4 × 400 m team in 1990 which set a European Championship record for the event. On 3 March 1991, Regis was a member of the British team which set the world indoor record for the rarely contested 4 x 200 metres with a time of 1:22.11, which has not yet been bettered. 

In 2000 Regis and fellow sprinter Marcus Adam were recruited for bobsleigh training with the British team. Adam went on to compete in the 2002 Winter Olympics.

Personal life
Growing up, Regis competed for Lewisham at the London Youth Games. He was appointed a Member of the Order of the British Empire (MBE) in the 1994 Birthday Honours for services to athletics. In 1989, he opened an all-weather running track at Wellesley Recreation Ground (known as "the Well") in Great Yarmouth.

He was a cousin of former England international footballer Cyrille Regis.

Regis's 15-year-old nephew, Adam Regis, was stabbed to death on Saturday 17 March 2007 in Plaistow, Newham, east London. The killers were described in media reports as five black youths, who fled in a car.

Personal bests
100 metres – 10.07 sec (Split, Yugoslavia, 28 August 1990)
200 metres – 19.87 sec (Sestriere, Italy, 31 July 1994, UK record)
400 metres – 45.48 sec (Walnut, California, US, 17 April 1993)

International competition record

References

External links
 
 
 Stellar Group Profile

1966 births
Living people
English male sprinters
British male sprinters
Olympic athletes of Great Britain
Olympic silver medallists for Great Britain
Olympic bronze medallists for Great Britain
Athletes (track and field) at the 1988 Summer Olympics
Athletes (track and field) at the 1992 Summer Olympics
English Olympic medallists
Commonwealth Games gold medallists for England
Commonwealth Games silver medallists for England
Commonwealth Games bronze medallists for England
Athletes (track and field) at the 1986 Commonwealth Games
Athletes (track and field) at the 1990 Commonwealth Games
Athletes (track and field) at the 1994 Commonwealth Games
Athletes (track and field) at the 1998 Commonwealth Games
World Athletics Championships medalists
European Athletics Championships medalists
Members of the Order of the British Empire
People from Lewisham
Black British sportsmen
English sportspeople of Barbadian descent
People educated at St Joseph's Academy, Blackheath
People educated at the John Roan School
Medalists at the 1992 Summer Olympics
Medalists at the 1988 Summer Olympics
Olympic silver medalists in athletics (track and field)
Olympic bronze medalists in athletics (track and field)
Commonwealth Games medallists in athletics
World Athletics indoor record holders (relay)
Goodwill Games medalists in athletics
World Athletics Indoor Championships winners
World Athletics Championships winners
Competitors at the 1994 Goodwill Games
Medallists at the 1990 Commonwealth Games
Medallists at the 1994 Commonwealth Games
Medallists at the 1998 Commonwealth Games